Laurent Dailliez (died 1991) was a French history doctor who graduated from Ecole pratique des hautes études. He was a researcher in medieval studies at the CNRS, a historian of the Crusades, and a specialist of the Knights Templar. Among other books, he wrote "Les Templiers". Dailliez was also the author of the article on the Templars in the leading French language encyclopedia, Encyclopedia Universalis.

Reviews
Dailliez is mentioned in the bibliography of the French specialist of the Knight Templars Alain Demurger, and referenced repeatedly from his book Jacques de Molay, dernier grand maitre du Temple (1974). Dailliez's collection of the Templar's Rule was used in the bibliography of The Real History Behind the Templars by Sharan Newman.  Newman noted that many versions of the Rule were available, but chose the Dailliez version since it was in both Old French and Modern French. Some work by Dailliez is also referenced in Reconquest and Crusade in Medieval Spain by Joseph F. O'Callaghan. Daillez is referenced by Malcolm Barber in the bibliography and notes of his book The New Knighthood- A History of the Order of the Temple for his book on the rule of the Templars; in Ivanhoe (Penguin Classics) by Walter Scott and Graham Tulloch; in Les Chevaliers teutoniques by Henry Bogdan for his book on the Teutonic Knights; in "Monasticon Praemonstratense: Id Est, Historia Canoniarum Atque Circariarum : 2 Parts" by Norbert Backmund for his work on the Abbaye Notre-Dame D'Huveaune.

Various works of Dailliez are also referenced in De tempeliers: de tempelorde tijdens de kruistochten en in de Lage landen J. Hosten (Dutch); The Crusades and the Military Orders by József Laszlovszky, Zsolt Hunyadi; The "polytyque Churche": Religion and Early Tudor Political Culture, 1485-1516 by Peter Iver Kaufman; Europa an der Wende vom 11. Zum 12. Jahrhundert by Klaus Herbers and Werner Goez; 
Knighthoods of Christ: Essays on the History of the Crusades by Norman Housley and Malcolm Barber, Tournament by David Crouch; Il mezzogiorno normanno-svevo e le crociate by Giosuè Musca for his work Les Templiers en Flandre; Historia, clima y paisaje by Antonio López Gómez for his work on The order of Montesa; Crusader Archaeology: The Material Culture of the Latin East by Adrian J. Boas; Saint Blaise: Evêque de Sébaste, Arménie mineure by Armand Tchouhadjian.

Criticism
Demurger complained that Dailliez usually does not provide references for his work, and also accused him of taking "mischievous pleasure in muddying the waters," such as by asserting the claim that Jacques de Molay, Grand Master of the Knights Templar, had been a general in the Mongol army and participated in an attack on Jerusalem. Demurger elsewhere highlighted some mistakes made by Dailliez, saying an assertion was "false but held as true by Dailliez, who is usually more serious."

Bibliography
 La Roque d'Antheron, 1967
 Les templiers: ces inconnus, 1972
 Bibliographie du Temple, C.E.P, Paris, 1972, 216p.
 Les Templiers et les règles de l'Ordre du Temple, P. Belfond, Paris, 1972, 267p. 
 Jacques de Molay : dernier maître du Temple, R. Dumas, Paris, 1974, 208p.  
 À la recherche la Bretagne celtique, 1974
 La France des Templiers, Marabout, coll. « Guide Marabout », Paris, 1974, 185p.
 Combat contre le cancer, 1974
 Sur les chemins de la Bretagne des calvaires, 1975
 Découvrir la Provence romane, 1976
 Les Templiers ces inconnus, Libr. académique Perrin, coll. « Présences de l'histoire », Paris, 1977, 405p. 
 La Règle des Templiers, 1977
 Les Chevaliers de Montjoie, 1977
 Les Templiers en Provence, 1977
 Ordre de Saint-Jean de Jérusalem au Portugal, XI-XVe siècles, 1977
 L'ordre de Montesa, successeur des Templiers, Alpes Méditerranée édition, Nice, 1977, 160p.
 Les Saintes Maries de la Mer: mythes ou légendes, 1978
 Abbaye de Silvacane, 1978
 Abbayes de Provence, 1978
 Les templiers : Flandre, Hainaut, Brabant, Liège et Luxembourg, 1978
 Les Cloîtres de Provence, 1978
 La Règle des Templiers, Alpes Méditerranée édition, Nice, 1978, 400p. 
 Aix-en-Provence : le Cloître de la cathedrale, 1978
 Templiers de Provence, Presses universitaires de Nice et de Corse, coll. « Collection Connaissance de la Provence et de la Corse » n°5, Nice, 1979, 130p. 
 Les chevaliers teutoniques, 1979, Librairie Académique Perrin
 Vence: une cité, un évêché, un canton, 1979
 Le Thoronet, 1979
 Saint-Pons de Gemenos, 1979
 Histoire de l'ordre du Temple, 1980
 Les Templiers : gouvernement et institutions, Alpes Méditerranée édition, coll. « Histoire de l'ordre du Temple », Nice, 1980.
 Les Templiers et l'agriculture, ou les composts templiers, 1981
 Abbazie Cistercensi e ordine di Citeaux in Italia = Abbayes Cisterciennes en Italie et ordre de Cîteaux, 1983
 Guide de la France templière, 1992
 Règles et statuts de l'ordre du Temple, Dervy, Paris, 1996 (2e éd. augm.), 399p.  
 Les Templiers, Perrin, coll. « Tempus », Paris, 2003, 404p.

As co-author
 With A. Joubert-Chapdeleine: À la recherche de la Bretagne celtique, 1974
 With Jacques Basnage, sieur de Beauval, Jean Pol Lombard: Règle et statuts de l'Ordre du Temple, 1996
 With Jean-Marie Rouart & Bruno Cortequisse: Mémoire de l'histoire, 1999

Footnotes

References
Demurger, Alain (2007). Jacques de Molay (French title), Last Templar (English title). Editions Payot&Rivages. .
Sharan Newman (2007), The Real History Behind the Templars. Berkley Trade; Berkley Trade Pbk. Ed. .
Joseph F. O'Callaghan (2004), Reconquest and Crusade in Medieval Spain. University of Pennsylvania Press. .
The Encyclopedia Universalis, article on "Les Templiers".

External links
Academic titles of Laurent Dailliez, Encyclopedia Universalis

Year of birth missing
1991 deaths
École pratique des hautes études alumni
20th-century French historians
Historians of the Crusades
French male writers